Saint Adulf (also Adolph, Adolf, Athwulf, Æthelwulf or Æðelwulf) (died  680 AD) was an Anglo-Saxon saint.

Life
Adulf is said to have been the brother of Botolph, but virtually nothing is known about his life. The story, which originated with a monk of Thorney, Folcard's, account of Botolph's life, that Adulf was at one-time bishop of Maastricht, is now generally thought to rest on a confusion of names and to have no substance. However, it does explain the reason today's saint is often honored as a bishop.

The monastery at Iken, in East Anglia, was destroyed in Viking raids. It is said that when by the orders of Æthelwold of Winchester, Botolph's body was disinterred for translation to the new abbey of Thorney, Adulf's body was buried with it, and as it proved impossible to disentangle the bones, the remains of both saints were taken to Thorney, where the relics of Adulf remained. The feast day of both saints is 17 June.

References and notes

External links
 

Year of birth unknown
680s deaths
East Anglian saints
7th-century Christian saints